Blyth Community Hospital is a health facility in Thoroton Street, Blyth, Northumberland, England. It is managed by Northumbria Healthcare NHS Foundation Trust.

History
The facility, which was commissioned at the instigation of local general practitioners, opened in 1987. In 2006 concerns were raised in the UK Parliament that the minor injuries centre at the hospital might have to close.

References

Hospital buildings completed in 1987
Hospitals established in 1987
Hospitals in Northumberland
NHS hospitals in England
1987 establishments in England